Janus Films is an American film distribution company. The distributor is credited with introducing numerous films, now considered masterpieces of world cinema, to American audiences, including the films of Michelangelo Antonioni, Sergei Eisenstein, Ingmar Bergman, Federico Fellini, Akira Kurosawa, Satyajit Ray, François Truffaut, Yasujirō Ozu and many other well-regarded directors. Ingmar Bergman's The Seventh Seal (1957) was the film responsible for the company's initial growth.

Janus has a close business relationship with The Criterion Collection regarding the release of its films on DVD and Blu-ray and is still an active theatrical distributor.

The company's name and logo come from Janus, the two-faced Roman god of transitions, passages, beginnings, and endings.

History
Janus Films was founded in 1956 by Bryant Haliday and Cyrus Harvey, Jr., in the historic Brattle Theater, a Harvard Square landmark in Cambridge, Massachusetts. Prior to the conception of Janus, Haliday and Harvey began screening both foreign and American films at the Brattle Theater and proceeded to regularly fill the 300-seat venue. Having purchased the theater, Haliday, together with Harvey, converted the Brattle into a popular movie house for the showing of art films.

Perceiving potential success in the film business, Haliday and Harvey moved into the New York City market and began running the 55th Street Playhouse. Janus Films was subsequently launched in March 1956 and the Playhouse was used as the primary location for exhibiting Janus-distributed films. The two owners eventually sold Janus Films in 1965 following a decline in the American art film market, and in 1966 Haliday also sold the Brattle, whilst Harvey continued to manage the theater into the 1970s.

In 1977, the Kino Lorber acquired rights to the company's film collection, which became the foundation for Kino's international library of films. 

Janus was later acquired by Saul J. Turell and William J. Becker. Their sons, Jonathan B. Turell and Peter Becker, who also own The Criterion Collection, are still involved in the business, with Turell serving as company director in 2006.

Recent releases
On October 24, 2006, in celebration of 50 years of business, the Criterion Collection released 50 of the films that Janus distributed in a large boxset containing 50 DVDs and a 200-page essay on the history of art house films. The package was called Essential Art House: 50 Years of Janus Films. A.O. Scott chose the set as his DVD pick when he co-hosted At the Movies with Ebert & Roeper. As part of its 44th Festival in 2006, the New York Film Festival presented a series called 50 Years of Janus Films, a tribute to the company.

In 2009, Janus Films released Revanche, its first first-run theatrical release in 30 years. Since then, with their distribution partner, Sideshow, Janus Films had released more recent films such as Drive My Car and EO.

Then, in 2010, Janus acquired domestic theatrical and home video rights to the Charlie Chaplin library under license from the Chaplin estate and worldwide distribution agent MK2. The Criterion division handles the Chaplin library for re-issue on DVD and Blu-ray, in addition to theatrical release.

Janus also currently manages part of the Caidin Film Company library for Westchester Films, and the Faces Distribution/John Cassavetes library for Jumer Productions, both companies' successors-in-interest to Castle Hill Productions.

References

External links
 – official site
Janus Films The Face of Art and Foreign Film at NPR

Film distributors of the United States
Entertainment companies based in New York City
Companies based in New York City
Mass media companies established in 1956
1956 establishments in Massachusetts
Privately held companies based in New York (state)
The Criterion Collection